Mirante do Paranapanema is a city in the western part of the state of São Paulo, in Brazil. It is part of the microregion of Presidente Prudente. The population is 18,338 (2020 est.) in an area of 1239 km². The altitude is 448 m. It is situated near the Paranapanema River, which forms the border with the state of Paraná here.

The municipality contains part of the  Great Pontal Reserve, created in 1942.

References

Municipalities in São Paulo (state)